Jean-Baptiste Blache de Beaufort (17 May 1765, in Berlin – 24 January 1834, in Toulouse) was a German ballet dancer and ballet master active in France.

A student of Deshayes, he learned the violin and cello and had what was in essence a provincial career, mainly at Bordeaux, where he succeeded Jean Dauberval. He worked briefly at the Opéra de Paris, putting on The Barber of Seville (1806) and Les Fêtes de Vulcain (1820) there. Among his best known and most popular ballets are Les Meuniers (1787, admired by Arthur Saint-Léon), L'Amour et la Folie, La Chaste Suzanne, La Fille soldat and Almaviva et Rosine (1806).

He retired to Toulouse and declined an offer from that theatre that he become its ballet master. His eldest son, Frédéric-Auguste Blache (1791- ?) revived his father's work at the Théâtre de la Porte Saint-Martin from 1816 to 1823, then at the Ambigu-Comique, where he revived the La Fille soldat. Frédéric-Auguste also wrote Polichinelle vampire, interpreted by Charles-François Mazurier (1823) and Jocko ou le Singe du Brésil (1825). Jean-Baptiste's younger son, Alexis-Scipion (1792-1852), was a ballet master at Lyon, Paris, Marseille, Bordeaux and St-Petersburg.

Musicians from Berlin
1765 births
1834 deaths
German male ballet dancers
German emigrants to France
French ballet masters
French choreographers
18th-century German ballet dancers
19th-century German ballet dancers